Sajani is a 1940 Hindi social film directed by Sarvottam Badami for Sudama Productions. Scripted by Zia Sarhadi, the film had music by Gyan Dutt and starred Prithviraj Kapoor, Sabita Devi, Snehprabha Pradhan, Noor Jehan, Dixit, and Ghory. Badami left Sagar Movietone where he had made satirical comedies to join his "mentor" Ambalal Patel at Sudama Productions to make "socially relevant film(s)", where Sajani was one of the first. Snehprabha Pradhan acted in several films produced by Chimanbhai Desai in 1940, including Sajani.

Cast
 Prithviraj Kapoor
 Sabita Devi
 Snehprabha Pradhan
 Noor Jehan
 Dixit
 Ghory
 Kesari
 Shakir
 Tarabai

Music
The film's music was composed by Gyan Dutt with lyrics by Pyare Lal Santoshi, Pandit Indra Chandra and Zia Sarhadi. The singers were Brijmala, Gyan Dutt and Snehlata Pradhan.

Song List

References

External links

1940 films
1940s Hindi-language films
Films scored by Gyan Dutt
Indian black-and-white films
Films directed by Sarvottam Badami